Senegalia polyacantha subsp. campylacantha is a perennial tree native to Africa.  Common names for it are whitethorn and witdoring. It is not listed as being a threatened species.  Its uses include wood and medicine.

Uses

Repellent uses
The root emits chemical compounds that repel animals including crocodiles, snakes and rats.

Medicinal purposes
Root extract of S. polycantha is useful for snakebites and is applied to wash the skin of children who are agitated at night time.

Wood
The tree is good for using as firewood, but its thorns complicate its use.  The tree's heartwood has a density of about 705 kg/m3.

References

polyacantha subsp. campylacantha
Trees of Africa
Plant subspecies
Plants used in traditional African medicine